Vladimir Viktorovich Dubatolov (born 1958) is a  Russian entomologist, lepidopterist, Doctor of Biological Sciences, full member of the Russian Entomological Society (since 1979), member of the European Lepidopterological Society (since 1998), curator of the insect collection of the Siberian Zoological Museum, leading researcher at the Institute of Systematics and Ecology of Animals SB RAS (Novosibirsk), leading researcher of the Federal State Budgetary Institution "Zapovednoye Priamurye" (Khabarovsk).

He Has described a number of zoological taxa. The names of these taxa (for attribution) are accompanied by the author abbreviation "Dubatolov".

Dubatolov was born on September 2, 1958 in Leningrad. His father was Viktor Nikolaevich Dubatolov (1924-2011), Doctor of Geological and Mineralogical Sciences, paleontologist, Honored Scientist of the Russian Federation. His mother was Yulia Afanasyevna Dubatolova  (1926-2005) - paleontologist, stratigrapher, candidate of geological and mineralogical sciences. There are three daughters: Svetlana, Elizabeth and Valeria.

In 1980 he graduated from the Faculty of Natural Sciences of Novosibirsk State University. He defended his thesis on the topic "Quantitative analysis of changes in the blade line of ammonoids in the process of evolution."

Since 1980 he has been working in Novosibirsk at the Zoological Museum of the Biological Institute of the Siberian Branch of the USSR Academy of Sciences (now - the Siberian Zoological Museum of the Institute of Animal Systematics and Ecology of the Siberian Branch of the Russian Academy of Sciences).

In 1993 he defended his Ph.D. thesis on the topic: "Diurnal Lepidoptera (Lepidoptera: Hesperioidea, Papilionoidea) of the mountains of Turkmenistan". In 2007 he defended his doctoral dissertation on the topic: "Lepidoptera subfamilies Arctiinae (Lepidoptera, Arctiidae) of the Palaearctic".

He is the curator of the collection of insects of the Siberian Zoological Museum of the Institute of Systematics and Ecology of Animals, Siberian Branch of the Russian Academy of Sciences.

Scientific interests
Research interests include taxonomy and faunistics, faunogenesis and biogeography of the Palaearctic butterflies Arctiinae, Papilionoidea, Russian butterflies from the families Hesperioidea , Geometroidea (without Geometridae), Bombycoidea, Sphingoidea, Noctuoidea; faunistics of Siberian butterflies from the families Tortricidae, Ethmiidae, and some other Microlepidoptera . Since 2003 he has been studying Lepidoptera of the Amur region.

He also works with some other insects: Neuropteroidea , Plecoptera , Vespoidea (Hymenoptera). From the late 1980s to 1991, he collected spiders in Central Asia, which were processed by D.V. Logunov and his colleagues.

Taxa named after Dubatolov
Genus:
 Dubatolovia de Freina, 2010 (Lepidoptera, Erebidae: Arctiinae) - Africa
 Dubatoloviana Bucsek, 2012 (Lepidoptera, Erebidae: Arctiinae) - Southeast Asia
 Dubatolova Kirti, Singh et Joshi, 2014 (Lepidoptera, Erebidae: Arctiinae) - Southeast Asia

Aranea, Salticidae:
 Sitticus (Attulus) dubatolovi Logunov et Rakov, 1998 - Kazakhstan
 Aelurillus dubatolovi Azarkina, 2002 - Turkmenistan

Acarina, Parholaspididae
 Neparholaspis dubatolovi Marchenko, 2016 - Sikhote-Alin

Coleoptera:
 Nebria (Catonebria) sajana dubatolovi Dudko et Shilenkov, 2001 (Carabidae) - Altai
 Cautires dubatolovi Kazantsev, 1995 (Lycidae) - south of the Russian Far East
 Clanoptilus (Hypoptilus) dubatolovi Tshernyshev, 1998 (Malachiidae) - Turkmenistan
 Colotes (Pseudodipnis) dubatolovi Tshernyshev, 2007 (Malachiidae) - Lower Volga region
 Leptapoderus (Pseudoleptapoderus) dubatolovi Legalov, 2003 (Attelabidae) - China
 Donus dubatolovi Leganov, 2011 (Curculionidae) - Kyrgyzstan

Lepidoptera:
 Semagystia dubatolovi Yakovlev, 2007 (Cossidae) - Turkmenistan: Köýtendag Range
 Caloptilia dubatolovi — speckled moth species (Gracillariidae),  endemic to the Russian Far East
 Buvatina dubatolovi Lvovsky, 2016 (Oecophoridae) - south of the Russian Far East
 Agonopterix dubatolovi Lvovsky, 1995 (Depressariidae) - Transbaikalia
 Dahlica dubatolovi (Solanikov, 1990) (Psychidae) - Yakutia
 Dichrorampha dubatolovi Syachina, 2008 (Tortricidae) - south of the Russian Far East
 Stenoptilia dubatolovi Ustjuzhanin, 2001 (Pterophoridae) - Turkmenistan: Köýtendag Range
 Agrisius dubatolovi Orhant, 2012 (Erebidae) - Southeast Asia
 Diduga dubatolovi Bayarsaikhan et Bae 2018 (Erebidae: Arctiinae) - Southeast Asia
 Eugoa dubatolovi Volynkin, Bucsek et Černý, 2018 (Erebidae: Arctiinae) - Southeast Asia
 Barsine dubatolovi Volynkin et Černý, 2019 (Erebidae: Arctiinae) - Southeast Asia
 Holoarctia dubatolovi Saldaitis et Ivinskis, 2005 (Erebidae: Arctiinae) - Altai
 Lygephila dubatolovi Fibiger, Kononenko et Nilsson, 2008 (Erebidae) - south of the Russian Far East
 Agrochola (Alpichola) dubatolovi Varga et Ronkay, 1991 (Noctuidae) - Turkmenistan : Kopet Dag range
 Lacanobia dubatolovi Volynkin, 2017 (Noctuidae) - Turkmenistan : Kopet Dag range

Subspecies:
 Euchloe ausonia dubatolovi Korshunov, 1995 (Pieridae) - Altai
 Clossiana tritonia dubatolovi Korshunov, 1987 (Nymphalidae) - Khamar-Daban
 Cardepia helix dubatolovi Hacker, 1998 (Noctuidae) - Tajikistan

References

External links

 List of scientific works of V.V. Dubatolov (more than 300 titles)
 List of insect taxa described by V.V. Dubatolov

Novosibirsk State University alumni
Russian entomologists
Lepidopterists
1958 births
Living people